Umkomasia feistmantelii is an unusually large species of Umkomasia from the Early Triassic of New South Wales, Australia.

Description 
Umkomasia feistmantelii is found both with cupules enclosing the large seeds and with cupules open and expandede into a star-shaped form.

Whole Plant Reconstruction 
Umkomasia feistmantelii from the Early Triassic of Australia may have been produced by the same plant as Pteruchus barrealensis (pollen organs) and Dicroidium zuberi (leaves)

See also 

 Evolution of plants

References

External links 
Paleodb.org: Umkomasia feistmanteli

Permian plants
Triassic plants
Pteridospermatophyta
Cisuralian life
Early Triassic life
Plants described in 1987
Cisuralian first appearances
Early Triassic extinctions